Senator Cleary may refer to:

Edward J. Cleary (1866–1942), Washington State Senate
M. H. Cleary (1853–1933), Illinois State Senate
Raymond E. Cleary III (born 1948), South Carolina State Senate